Hot Gates or Hot Gate may refer to:
 Thermopylae, a location in Greece famous for the Battle of Thermopylae 
 The Hot Gates, a collection of writing by William Golding
 The Hot Gate, third book in the Troy Rising series by John Ringo
 Hot Gates, a song written by Christopher Torr, and sung by Laurika Rauch